Vazha Kapanadze is a Georgian rugby union player. He plays as Prop for Grenoble in Top 14.

Notes

1995 births
Living people
Rugby union players from Georgia (country)
Union Sportive Bressane players
Rugby union props